Conifer may refer to:
Pinophyta (conifers), cone-bearing seed plants
Conifer, Colorado, an unincorporated town in the United States
Conifer High School
Conifer, Pennsylvania, an unincorporated community
Conifer Grove, a suburb of Auckland, New Zealand
Taiga,  a biome characterized by coniferous forests
USCGC Conifer (WLB-301), a U.S. Coast Guard seagoing buoy tender